Patsy Rodgers was the first Stampede Queen of the Calgary Stampede.  She became Stampede Queen in 1946 and returned as parade marshal, at age 82, in the 2008 Calgary Stampede parade. Rodgers died in November 2020 at the age of 95.

References

External links

Stampede Queens Alumni

1926 births
2020 deaths
People from Calgary